Alexander Vasilievich Gavrilenko (born 15 February 1950) is a Russian cardiac surgeon. He has been a corresponding member of the USSR Academy of Medical Sciences since 2004, and a full member (academician) of the Russian Academy of Sciences since 2016. He was honored the medals, such as, Order of Friendship of Peoples, Medal "In Commemoration of the 850th Anniversary of Moscow", Russian Federation Presidential Certificate of Honour and the Honored Scientist of the Russian Federation. In 2017, Gavrilenko was awarded the Order of Nikolai Pirogov by the European Academy of Sciences and Arts.

References 

1950 births
Living people
Physicians from Moscow
Russian cardiac surgeons
Academicians of the Russian Academy of Medical Sciences
Corresponding Members of the USSR Academy of Medical Sciences
Full Members of the Russian Academy of Sciences
Recipients of the Order of Friendship of Peoples